Baptist College may refer to:
American Baptist College
Arkansas Baptist College
Arlington Baptist College
Baptist College, Kohima
Baptist College of Florida
Baptist College of Health Sciences
Boston Baptist College
Carey Baptist College
Central Baptist College
Charleston Southern University, formed in 1964 as Baptist College
Chesapeake Baptist College
Fellowship Baptist College
Geelong Baptist College
Golden State Baptist College
Hillsdale Free Will Baptist College
International Baptist College
Irish Baptist College
Lynchburg Baptist College, now Liberty University
Midwestern Baptist College
Piedmont Baptist College
 Regent's Park Baptist College, London
Saker Baptist College
Southeastern Baptist College
Southeastern Free Will Baptist College
Trinity Baptist College
Yellowstone Baptist College
West Coast Baptist College
Williams Baptist College